Siah Chal (also Romanized as Sīāh Chal, Sīāh Chol, and Sīāchal; also known as Sevāh Chal) is a village in Beyranvand-e Jonubi Rural District, Bayravand District, Khorramabad County, Lorestan Province, Iran. At the 2006 census, its population was 72, in 18 families.

References 

Towns and villages in Khorramabad County